Trismelasmos nakula is a moth in the family Cossidae. It was described by Yakovlev in 2011. It is found on the Moluccas.

References

Zeuzerinae
Moths described in 2011